People commonly known by the family name Zantop include:
 Half and Susanne Zantop, victims in the Dartmouth Murders
 Susanne Mueller Zantop (born 1956)

Things commonly known as Zantop include:
 Zantop Flying Service
 Zantop Air Transport
 Zantop International Airlines

German-language surnames
Surnames of Swiss origin
Americanized surnames